Martin Franklin Conway (November 19, 1827 – February 15, 1882) was a U.S. congressman, consul to France, abolitionist, and advocate of the Free-State movement in Kansas.

Conway was born in Harford County, Maryland, the son of Dr. W. D. Conway and Frances (Maulsby) Conway.  His father was an Exploring Surveyor in the United States Navy, and a slave-owner.  Conway learned the printer's trade in Baltimore after leaving school at fourteen and became an organizer of the National Typographical Union. He married Emily Dykes in 1851, and studied law and was admitted to the bar in 1852.

Conway moved to the Kansas Territory in 1854, initially working as a special correspondent for the Baltimore Sun.

He soon resumed the practice of law and became involved in territorial politics. In March 1855, Conway was elected from Riley County to the first Territorial Council (Senate), but resigned prior to assuming his seat. In 1855, he was an active member at the Free-State meeting in Big Springs and became a delegate to the Topeka Constitutional convention.  In January 1856, he was elected Chief Justice of the Supreme Court under the Topeka constitution. In 1858, he served as president of the Leavenworth Constitutional Convention.

The following year, Conway was elected as representative to the U.S. Congress under the Wyandotte Constitution and, when Kansas entered the Union in January 1861, he was the new state's first congressman, serving as a Republican until March 3, 1863.

The Emancipation Proclamation went into effect on January 1, 1863; Conway spent the day in Massachusetts with Ralph Waldo Emerson, William Lloyd Garrison, Wendell Phillips, and Julia Ward Howe. That month, he put forth a resolution in Congress to recognize the Confederacy then wage war on the south as war between nations.

While in the U.S. House of Representatives, he was known for his opposition to slavery but also served as a member of the Washington, D.C. "peace convention" in an effort to avert civil war.  He was not returned to congress for another term, but continued to live in Washington. Conway defended President Andrew Johnson against political assaults waged by Radical Republicans in Congress and, in June 1866, Johnson appointed Conway as consul to Marseille, France.

While living in Washington during the fall of 1873, Conway had a violent confrontation with personal and political enemy, Samuel C. Pomeroy, the former U. S. senator from Kansas.  He was arrested for firing three shots at and slightly wounding Pomeroy, but did not stand trial. Conway became a patient at St. Elizabeth, the Government Hospital for the Insane in Washington, D.C., and died at age fifty-four.

References

External links

 Territorial Kansas History. Hundreds of personal letters and more.
 Hon. Martin F Conway  More details and quotes.

	

1827 births
1882 deaths
People from Harford County, Maryland
People from Riley County, Kansas
American war correspondents
American abolitionists
Members of the Kansas Territorial Legislature
Republican Party members of the United States House of Representatives from Kansas
19th-century American journalists
American male journalists
19th-century American male writers
19th-century American politicians
Politically motivated migrations
Washington, D.C., Republicans